Sempaja Stadium or Madya Sempaja Stadium is a football stadium in Samarinda, Indonesia. It is located in Jalan KH Wahid Hasyim.

History
In 2007, the stadium was chosen as the best stadium in the Liga Indonesia First Division. It was used by Persisam Putra Samarinda before they moved to Segiri Samarinda Stadium.

Facilities
There is a hotel to accommodate athletes competing in the stadium.

References

External links
 Soccerway.com

Sports venues in Indonesia
Sports venues in East Kalimantan
Sports venues in Samarinda
Football venues in Indonesia
Football venues in East Kalimantan
Football venues in Samarinda
Athletics (track and field) venues in Indonesia
Athletics (track and field) venues in East Kalimantan
Athletics (track and field) venues in Samarinda
Multi-purpose stadiums in Indonesia
Multi-purpose stadiums in East Kalimantan
Multi-purpose stadiums in Samarinda
Buildings and structures in East Kalimantan
Buildings and structures in Samarinda